Nikola Kovačević (born 14 February 1983) is a Serbian volleyball player, a member of Serbia men's national volleyball team and French club Saint Nazaire VB, bronze medalist of the World Championship 2010, European Champion 2011, bronze medalist of the European Championship in 2007 and 2013, multimedalist of the World League.

Personal life
He has two brothers - Uroš (born 1993), who is also a volleyball player, and Savo. He was married to Jasmine and has two children with her, daughters Mia and Emma. In May 2016 he married Ana (nee Matijasević), who is a daughter of volleyball coach Nikola Matijasević and sister of volleyball players' manager Georges Matijasević. With Ana he has two sons Noa and Teo

Career

Clubs
In season 2012/2013 he played for Polish club from PlusLiga – Asseco Resovia Rzeszów. He won with the club Polish Championship in 2013. He spent the next season in the Russian club Ural Ufa. On 17 March 2014 official site of Russian club announced that the contract with Kovacevic has been terminated. The reason for the premature termination of contract were financial problems of the club. In 2014 he spent a few months in the club from Verona and then moved to Chinese team Fudan University Shanghai.

National team
He is a gold medalist of 2011 European Championship and bronze medalist of 2013 European Championship. He was a member of the national team at the 2012 Summer Olympics in London. On 19 July 2015 Serbian national team with him in squad went to the final of World League, but they lost with France 0–3 and achieved silver medal.

Sporting achievements
 National championships
 2002/2003  Serbian Championship, with Crvena Zvezda
 2009/2010  Greek Championship, with Aris Thessaloniki
 2012/2013  Polish Championship, with Asseco Resovia Rzeszów
 2014/2015  Chinese Championship, with Shanghai Golden Age
 2014/2015  French Championship, with Paris Volley
 2016/2017  Iranian Championship, with Paykan Tehran
 2017/2018  Romanian SuperCup, with CS Arcada Galați
 2017/2018  Romanian Championship, with Paykan Tehran

 National team
 2007  CEV European Championship
 2008  FIVB World League
 2009  FIVB World League
 2010  FIVB World League
 2010  FIVB World Championship
 2011  CEV European Championship
 2013  CEV European Championship
 2015  FIVB World League

Individually
 2011: CEV European Championship – Best Receiver
 2015: Chinese Championship – Best Receiver

References

1983 births
Living people
Sportspeople from Kraljevo
Serbian men's volleyball players
Olympic volleyball players of Serbia
Volleyball players at the 2008 Summer Olympics
Volleyball players at the 2012 Summer Olympics
Expatriate volleyball players in Greece
Expatriate volleyball players in Italy
Expatriate volleyball players in Russia
Expatriate volleyball players in Poland
Expatriate volleyball players in China
Expatriate volleyball players in Germany
Expatriate volleyball players in France
Expatriate volleyball players in Iran
Expatriate volleyball players in Romania
Serbian expatriate sportspeople in Greece
Serbian expatriate sportspeople in Italy
Serbian expatriate sportspeople in Russia
Serbian expatriate sportspeople in Poland
Serbian expatriate sportspeople in China
Serbian expatriate sportspeople in France
Serbian expatriate sportspeople in Germany
Serbian expatriate sportspeople in Iran
Serbian expatriate sportspeople in Romania
European champions for Serbia
Mediterranean Games bronze medalists for Serbia
Competitors at the 2005 Mediterranean Games
Ural Ufa volleyball players
Mediterranean Games medalists in volleyball
Resovia (volleyball) players